Cassandra Fernando (born c. 1988) is an Australian politician. A member of the Australian Labor Party (ALP), she has been the MP for the Division of Holt since the 2022 federal election.

Early life
Fernando was born in Sri Lanka and came to Australia with her parents in 1999 at the age of 11. She grew up in Dandenong North, Victoria, and holds a diploma in hospitality and a certificate in education support.

Fernando worked at Woolworths in Dandenong Plaza for almost 15 years, including as a pastry chef. She became a delegate to the Shop, Distributive and Allied Employees Association (SDA) and subsequently worked as an SDA organiser for five years.

Politics
In March 2022, Fernando won ALP preselection for the seat of Holt at the 2022 federal election, following the retirement of incumbent MP Anthony Byrne. She is a member of the SDA faction, which was granted the right, under the federal intervention into the Victorian branch which has led to a suspension of democratic processes in the Branch, to preselect the candidate in Holt despite the left faction having larger membership numbers due to ethnic branch-stacking in the seat.

She is the first Sri Lankan born woman to take a seat in the Australian parliament.

References
 

Sri Lankan emigrants to Australia
Australian trade unionists
Labor Right politicians
Living people
1980s births
21st-century Australian politicians
21st-century Australian women politicians
Members of the Australian House of Representatives for Holt
Members of the Australian House of Representatives
Women members of the Australian House of Representatives
Australian Labor Party members of the Parliament of Australia
Australian women trade unionists
Australian chefs
Politicians from Melbourne